Varoujan Hakhbandian, mostly known as Varoujan (Qazvin, 4 December 1936 – Tehran, 17 September 1977) was an Iranian composer, songwriter and arranger of Armenian descent.

He has composed and written songs for Ebi, Googoosh, Dariush, and Farhad Mehrad.

The music for the movie "Bar Faraaze Aasemaanha" (High in the Skies), composed shortly before his death, is one of his famous works.

Varoujan Hakhbandian made songs for some films. As an example The Dagger and The Beehive.

Filmography 
 Beehive (1975)

References

 
 
 
 
 
 
 
 
 
 
 
  ویژه‌نامه‌ی واروژان، ماهنامه‌ی هنر موسیقی، حمید ناصحی، ۱۳۹۵، شماره ۱۶۲
 
 
 
 
 واروژان هاخباندیان -درگذشت واروژان هاخباندیان (1356 – 1315) آهنگساز و تنظیم‌کننده مرکز موسیقی و سرود صدا و سیمای جمهوری اسلامی ایران 
 فصلنامه فرهنگی پیمان
 منتخبی از آثار واروژان فصلنامه فرهنگی پیمان
 واروژان بود و دیگر هیچ
 آهنگسازان اعتراض 
 از صبح روز چهارم تا بر فراز آسمان‌ها

External links  

 

Iranian people of Armenian descent
People from Qazvin
1977 deaths
1936 births
Iranian composers
Iranian songwriters
Ethnic Armenian composers
Iranian music arrangers